Mehdi Tikdari (born July 12, 1996) is an Iranian football player who plays as a right back for Gol Gohar Sirjan in the Persian Gulf Pro League.

Club career

Tractor 
Mehdi Tikdari extended her contract with this team for five seasons in December 2020 under an agreement with Mohammad Alipour, CEO of Tractor.

Honours
 Tractor

 Hazfi Cup (1): 2019–20

Career statistics

References 

 https://balkans.aljazeera.net/sports/live-scores/football/player/116248/mehdi-tikdari
 https://www.flashscore.info/player/tikdery-mehdi/zonBsM8U/ 
 https://fmdataba.com/21/p/498103/mehdi-tikdari/

External links 
 Mehdi Tikdari at PersianLeague.com
 
 
 
 
 https://www.eurosport.com/football/mehdi-tikdari_prs575650/person.shtml

1996 births
Living people
Iranian footballers
Association football forwards
Tractor S.C. players